Eupogonius is a genus of longhorn beetles of the subfamily Lamiinae. It was described in Journal of the Academy of Natural Sciences of Philadelphia by John Lawrence LeConte in 1852. The species are found across Eastern North America south to Argentina in forests and woodlots.

Species 
Eupogonius contains the following species:

References

 
Desmiphorini